Charles Thomas Burgess (30 June 1886 – 14 January 1978) was an English cricketer.  Burgess was a right-handed batsman who bowled right-arm slow.  He was born at Hastings, Sussex.

Burgess made a single first-class appearance for Sussex against Nottinghamshire at the County Ground, Hove in the 1919 County Championship.  In Sussex's first-innings, he was dismissed for 2 runs by Benjamin Flint.  Burgess took 3 wickets in Nottinghamshire's first and only innings, finishing with figures of 3/39 from eleven overs.  He was dismissed for a single run in Sussex's second-innings, this time becoming one of Tom Richmond's 6 wickets.  Nottinghamshire won the match by an innings and 175 runs.  This was his only major appearance for Sussex.

He died at Crediton, Devon on 14 January 1978.

References

External links
Charles Burgess at ESPNcricinfo
Charles Burgess at CricketArchive

1886 births
1978 deaths
Sportspeople from Hastings
English cricketers
Sussex cricketers